Barbara Harel (born 5 May 1977 in Nantes) is a French judoka who competed in the 2000 Summer Olympics, in the 2004 Summer Olympics, and in the 2008 Summer Olympics.

References

External links
 
 
 

1977 births
Living people
Sportspeople from Nantes
French female judoka
Olympic judoka of France
Judoka at the 2000 Summer Olympics
Judoka at the 2004 Summer Olympics
Judoka at the 2008 Summer Olympics
Mediterranean Games silver medalists for France
Competitors at the 2009 Mediterranean Games
Mediterranean Games medalists in judo
21st-century French women
20th-century French women